A number of steamships were named Breslau, including

 , a British cargo ship in service 1882–1932
 , a German cargo ship in service 1901–14

See also
 , an Imperial German Navy cruiser in service 1912–1918 transferred 1914 to the Ottoman Navy and renamed Midilli

Ship names